Greenville Presbyterian Church and Cemetery is a historic church that was organized in 1829 and its cemetery in Greenville, Georgia. The church building was built in 1836.   The property was added to the National Register in 2002.

The church building is a one-story  wood-frame building with wood lap siding on a continuous brick
foundation over older piers.

References

Presbyterian churches in Georgia (U.S. state)
Churches on the National Register of Historic Places in Georgia (U.S. state)
Protestant Reformed cemeteries
Churches completed in 1836
19th-century Presbyterian church buildings in the United States
Buildings and structures in Meriwether County, Georgia
National Register of Historic Places in Meriwether County, Georgia